Mark D. Bright is an American comic book and storyboard artist. Sometimes credited as Doc Bright (a play on his initials), he is best known for pencilling the Marvel Comics Iron Man story Armor Wars, the two Green Lantern: Emerald Dawn miniseries for DC Comics, for painting the cover to Marvel Comics' Transformers #5 and for co-creating Quantum and Woody with writer Christopher J. Priest. Bright later became a freelance storyboard artist, although he and Priest reunited for a five-issue Quantum and Woody miniseries  published by the new incarnation of Valiant Comics in 2014–2015, but set in the continuity of the original Quantum and Woody series.

Biography

His work in comics began in 1978 with a three-page story in House of Mystery #257 (April 1978) His first regular work was providing the art for the Christopher J. Priest (then going by his birth name, Jim Owsley) penned Falcon mini-series in 1983.  One issue had been completed by artist Paul Smith, and Bright pencilled the remaining three issues.

He again collaborated with Priest on the final 10 issues of Power Man and Iron Fist. Bright's regular-artist runs on comic-book series include Solo Avengers, Iron Man, G.I. Joe, Green Lantern, Action Comics (when it was published weekly),  Milestone Comics' Icon and Acclaim Comics' Quantum and Woody.  Although Bright inked some of his covers, most of his interior comics artwork was created in collaboration with an inker, primarily Romeo Tanghal, Randy Emberlin, Greg Adams and Mike Gustovich. During his years as a full-time comic book artist, Bright also provided artwork for analogous trading cards: The Green Lantern Hal Jordan card for Impel's 1992 DC Cosmic Cards, approximately one-third of Impel's 1991 G.I. Joe trading card set, and all of the Green Lantern and Green Lantern Corps artwork for Impel/Skybox's 1993 DC Cosmic Teams trading cards.

After 20 years in American comic books, Bright moved into storyboarding for commercials, and live-action television and feature films, notably including M. Night Shyamalan's The Last Airbender. He has occasionally returned to comics, including an Untold Tales of the New Universe one-shot for Marvel Comics and a Transformers Spotlight issue for IDW Publishing.

He also created the Damaged comic series with Jason McKee of A-10 Comics.  Bright's Christian-themed comic strip ...level path, that he writes and draws, is occasionally updated on his website.

Bibliography
Comics work (interior pencil art) includes:

DC Comics
A. Bizarro, miniseries, #1–4 (1999)
Action Comics Weekly #622–635 (1988)
Aquaman Annual #5 (1999)
Batman 422, 424, 425, 449 (1988–89)
Batman: League of Batmen #1–2 (48-pages each, pencils, with writer Doug Moench, DC Comics, 2001)
Batman: Shadow of the Bat #34 (1995)
Deadman: Dead Again, miniseries, #4 (2001)
Firebrand #6 (1996)
Ghosts #100 (1981)
Green Lantern, vol. 3, #13–17, 19, #25–31, 33–35, 38–39, 41–43, 46, 132–133, Special #2, 80-Page Giant #2 (1991–2001)
Green Lantern Corps Quarterly #1–3 (1992)
Green Lantern: Emerald Dawn, miniseries, #1–6 (1989–90)
Green Lantern: Emerald Dawn II, miniseries, #1–6 (1991)
House of Mystery #257 (1978)
Legion of Super-Heroes vol. 2, #59 (1989)
Mister Miracle vol. 2 #19 (1990)
Secret Origins #36 (1989)
Superman: The Man of Steel #31, Annual #3 (1994)
The New Titans #56, 87 (1992–93)
Valor #1–4 (1992–93)
Wonder Woman vol. 2 #137–138 (1998)

Milestone Media
Hardware #14 (fill-in pencils, with writer Dwayne McDuffie, 1994)
Icon #1–10, 13–17, 19–25, 27–31, 33–36, 38–42 (1993–97)
Milestone Forever #1–2, (partial pencils for 48-page specials, with writer Dwayne McDuffie, 2010)
Worlds Collide Special (1994)

Paradox Press
The Big Book of Bad (one page story, pencils and inks, DC Comics/Paradox Press, 1998)
The Big Book of Little Criminals (one page story, pencils and inks, DC Comics/Paradox Press, 1996)
The Big Book of Urban Legends (one page story, pencils and inks, DC Comics/Paradox Press, 1994)
The Big Book of the Weird Wild West (one page story, pencils and inks with writer John Whalen, DC Comics/Paradox Press, 1998)

Marvel Comics
Avengers #224, Annual #17 (1982, 1988)
Amazing Spider-Man On Bullying Prevention, (16-pages, with writer Brett Lewis, Target giveaway comic, 2003) 
Black Panther, vol. 2, #11–12, 24 (1999–2000)
Captain America #358–365 (1989)
Captain Marvel, vol. 2, #1 (1989)
Classic X-Men (backup story) #36 (1989)
Dazzler #25, 32–33 (1983–84)
Falcon, miniseries, #2–4 (1983–84)
Fantastic Four Annual #18 (1984)
G.I. Joe: A Real American Hero #35–36, 89–90, 92–96, 98, 100–106, 108 (1985–91)
Iron Man #200–201, 203–208, 210, 215–217, 220–223, 225–231, 274, Annual #9, 15 (1985–94)
Marvel Comics Presents (Iron Man) #51 (1990)
Marville, miniseries, #1–6 (2002)
Untold Tales of the New Universe: D.P. 7, (one-shot, part of the "Untold Tales of the New Universe" fifth-week event of one-shots, with writer C. B. Cebulski, Marvel Comics, 2006)
Power Man and Iron Fist #115–125 (1985–86)
Rom #56 (1984)
Solo Avengers (Hawkeye) #1–3, 9–11 (1987–88)
Spider-Man vs. Wolverine (one-shot) (1987)
Thor #333–335 (1983)
Team America #9 (1983)
West Coast Avengers Annual #1 (1986)
X-Factor #120 (1996)

Other publishers
Predator 2 #2 (movie adaptation) (pencils, 32 pages, with writer/screenplay adaptor Franz Henkel, (Dark Horse Comics, 1991)
The Dark #1 (Continüm Comics, 1993)
Primortals #5 (fill-in pencils for 13 pages, with writer Christopher Mills, Tekno Comics, 1995)
Quantum and Woody #0–8, 10–17, 32, 18–20 (pencils, with writer Christopher J. Priest, Acclaim Comics, 1997–1998) (See note below for publication history.)
Quantum and Woody #32, 18–20 (pencils, with writer Christopher J. Priest, Acclaim Comics, 1998–1999) (See note below for publication history.)
Master Lock Presents: The Incredible Hulk #1 (pencils for promo comic, with writer Robin D. Laws, Marvel Comics, 2003)
Transformers Spotlight: Nightbeat (pencils and inks, with writer Simon Furman, IDW Publishing, 2006)

(Quantum and Woody note:  The series was canceled in 1998 with issue #17.  When Acclaim Comics reorganized and relaunched its comic book line the following year, Quantum and Woody resumed publication.  As a joke to capitalize on the number of months that had passed since issue #17, the first new issue released was #32, to match the number of months the series had been off the stands, as if the series had continued all along.  Issue #32 features a storyline that has jumped ahead, with no indication of what has happened just before, and a cliffhanger ending that only would have been resolved had Quantum and Woody continued publishing for an additional 15 months.  The following month it resumed its original numbering at #18, picking up the narrative from #17.  Bright pencilled through issue #20, but issue #21 was a fill-in by artist Oscar Jimenez, and the series' last, as it was cancelled once again.)

As writer or co-writer

G.I. Joe: A Real American Hero (Marvel Comics) issue #109(credited as co-plotter)
Static #44-45 (Milestone Media, 1997)

As pin-up contributor, partial list only

The Official Handbook of the Marvel Universe (assorted)
Who's Who in the DC Universe (assorted)
L.E.G.I.O.N. Annual #5 (DC Comics, 1994)
G.I. Joe #129, pin-up of Torpedo, Marvel Comics, 1992
G.I. Joe #131, pin-up of Duke, Marvel Comics, 1992

Reprints and collections of M.D. Bright's work
Iron Man: The Armor Wars (reprints Iron Man #225–232, features seven issues by Bright, Marvel Comics, 1990)
The Many Armors of Iron Man
Green Lantern: Emerald Dawn (first printing, newsprint paper stock, reprints Green Lantern: Emerald Dawn #1–6, DC Comics, 1991)
Icon: A Hero's Welcome (first printing, reprints Icon #1–8, DC Comics, 1996)
GOAT: H.A.E.D.U.S. #1 (contains 3 pages from Quantum and Woody #15, Acclaim Comics 1998)
Quantum and Woody: The Director's Cut (reprints Quantum and Woody #1–4, plus new pages, features four issues by Bright, Acclaim Comics, 1997)
Quantum and Woody: Kiss Your Ass Goodbye (reprints Quantum and Woody #5–8, plus new pages, features four issues by Bright, Acclaim Comics, 1998)
Quantum and Woody: Holy S-Word, We're Cancelled?! (reprints Quantum and Woody #9–12, plus new pages, features three issues by Bright, Acclaim Comics, 1998)
Quantum and Woody: Magnum Force (reprints Quantum and Woody #13–16, plus new pages, features four issues by Bright, Acclaim Comics, 1999)
G.I. Joe vol 4 (reprints G.I. Joe #31–40, reprints Bright's partial pages within issue #s 35 & 36, Marvel Comics, 2002)
Green Lantern: Emerald Dawn (second printing, reprints Green Lantern: Emerald Dawn #1–6, features six issues by Bright, DC Comics, 2003)
Green Lantern: Emerald Dawn II (reprints Green Lantern: Emerald Dawn II, features six issues by Bright, DC Comics, 2003
Iron Man: Armor Wars (new edition, colors reseparated and glossy paper, reprints Iron Man #225–232, features seven issues by Bright, Marvel Comics, 2007)
Iron Man: The Dragon Seed Saga (reprints Iron Man issues #270–275, features one issue by Bright, Marvel Comics, 2008)
Iron Man: The Many Armors of Iron Man (new edition with new color separations and glossy paper stock from 1993 version, now includes Iron Man issue #200, one issue by Bright, Marvel Comics, 2008)
Iron Man: Armor Wars (new edition, second printing, black cover, reprints Iron Man #225–232, features seven issues by Bright, Marvel Comics, 2010)
Iron Man: Armor Wars Prologue reprints Iron Man #215–224, features eight issues by Bright, Marvel Comics, 2010)
Classic G.I. Joe vol. 4 (reprint of Marvel's 2002 G.I. Joe vol. 4 trade paperback, IDW Publishing, 2009)
Icon: A Hero's Welcome (second printing, reprints Icon #1–8, DC Comics, 2009)
Icon: The Mothership Connection (reprints Icon #13, 19–22, features three and a half issues by Bright, DC Comics, 2010)
Classic G.I. Joe vol. 9 (reprints G.I. Joe #81–90, features two issues by Bright, IDW Publishing, 2010)
Classic G.I. Joe vol. 10 (reprints G.I. Joe #91–100, features six issues by Bright, IDW Publishing, 2011)
Classic G.I. Joe vol. 11 (reprints G.I. Joe #101–110, features seven issues by Bright, IDW Publishing, 2011)
The Complete Quantum and Woody Classic Omnibus (reprints the complete original Q&W series, along with two additional original-era Valiant comics)
 Milestone Compendium One (reprints Blood Syndicate #1-12, Hardware #1-12, Icon #1-10, Shadow Cabinet #0, Static #1-8, Xombi #0-11; features ten issues by Bright, DC Comics/Milestone Media, 2022)
 Milestone Compendium Two (reprints Blood Syndicate #13-23, Hardware #13-21, Icon #11-21, Shadow Cabinet #1-4, Static #9-20, Steel #6-7, Superboy #6-7, Superman: The Man of Steel #35-36, Worlds Collide #1; features nine issues by Bright, DC Comics/Milestone Media, 2023)

References

External links

1955 births
Living people
American comics artists
American storyboard artists
African-American comics creators
American comics creators
People from Montclair, New Jersey
Artists from New Jersey
Place of birth missing (living people)
21st-century African-American people
20th-century African-American people